James Gale (born 14 September 1986) is a cricketer who plays for Guernsey. He played in the 2014 ICC World Cricket League Division Five tournament.

References

External links
 

1986 births
Living people
Guernsey cricketers
Sportspeople from Shrewsbury